Bishop Michael Fu Tieshan (Simplified Chinese: 傅铁山, Traditional Chinese: 傅鐵山; November 3, 1931 – April 20, 2007) of Beijing was a top leader of the Catholic Patriotic Association.

Biography 
Fu was born in Qingyuan County,Hebei province. He served as a priest, and in 1979 was made a bishop by Beijing. The appointment lacked the approval of the pope. He was appointed chairman of the Chinese Catholic Patriotic Association in 1998. He was acting president of the government-recognized Bishops' Conference of the Catholic Church in China. He was named vice chairman of the standing committee of the National People's Congress, China's legislature, in 2003.

Fu died in Beijing Hospital from lung cancer. His death was announced in Beijing by the Xinhua news agency.

Anthony Liu Bainian, vice chairman of the Patriotic Association, told UCA News, an Asian church news agency, that Fu wanted to "see his priests, whom he hasn't met for a long time" due to his long illness.

He was succeeded by Joseph Li Shan.

References 

 (April 22, 2007). Fu Tieshan, 76; bishop of Chinese church. The Los Angeles Times

External links 
 
 Patriotic Church bishop critically ill.  AsiaNews
 Fu Tieshan, "tragic" figure of the Chinese Patriotic Church, dies.  AsiaNews

1931 births
2007 deaths
Deaths from lung cancer
People from Baoding
Bishops of the Catholic Patriotic Association
Deaths from cancer in the People's Republic of China
Vice Chairpersons of the National People's Congress